Desert hare may refer to:
Desert hare (Lepus tibetanus), found in Northwest China
Cape hare (Lepus capensis), found in Africa and west/central Asia
Hare (hieroglyph), depicting the Cape hare
Black-tailed jackrabbit (Lepus californicus), also called the American desert hare; found in the US and Mexico